Fantastiske Toyota is the first album from the Danish pop and rock band, TV-2. The album was released in 1981; the band was at the time a quintet as Niels Dan Andersen plays the sax and keyboard. When recording it, the drummer Sven Gaul was on holiday in the US, so Eigil Madsen plays the drums for most of the songs. The album proved a moderate success compared to the later albums of the band. Fantastiske Toyota reached sales of 28.000 records.

Track listing 

Words and music by Steffen Brandt, except "Kolde hjerner" which contains an excerpt of the poem "Jeg er havren" by Danish poet Jeppe Aakjær and "Uh, jeg ville ønske jeg var mig", lyrics by Brandt and Georg Olesen

References

1981 debut albums
TV-2 (band) albums